Bilal Rehman (born 23 February 1982) is a Pakistani politician who had been a member of the National Assembly of Pakistan from 2008 to May 2018.

Early life

He was born on 23 February 1982.

Political career

He was elected to the National Assembly of Pakistan as an independent candidate from Constituency NA-36 (Tribal Area-I) in 2008 Pakistani general election. He received 5,270 votes and defeated an independent candidate Shahbaz Khan Mohmand.

He was re-elected to the National Assembly as an independent candidate from Constituency NA-36 (Tribal Area-I) in 2013 Pakistani general election. He received 9,005 votes and defeated a candidate of Jamaat-e-Islami Pakistan.

References

Living people
Pashtun people
Pakistani MNAs 2013–2018
People from Mohmand District
1982 births
Pakistani MNAs 2008–2013